Hippichthys albomaculosus is a species of freshwater pipefish of the family Syngnathidae. It has been found in fresh and brackish waters on Vanua Levu Island, in Fiji, adjacent to mangroves. Little is known about the feeding habits of this species, but it is likely to feed on small crustaceans similar to other pipefish. This species is ovoviviparous, with males carrying eggs in a brood pouch before giving birth to live young.

References

Further reading
IUCN Seahorse, Pipefish & Stickleback Specialist Group

Fish described in 2010
albomaculosus
Freshwater fish
Endemic fauna of Fiji
Vertebrates of Fiji